Gobius tropicus is a species of fish currently classified in the family Gobiidae.  It is native the Atlantic waters around Ascension Island.  The actual taxonomic position of this species is uncertain and it is suspected that it is not even a goby.

References

tropicus
Fish of the Atlantic Ocean
Tropical fish
Fish described in 1765
Taxa named by Pehr Osbeck